Ihar Khaladkow (born 19 April 1991) is a Belarusian professional football player.

In 2020, Khaladkow was found guilty of being involved in a match-fixing schema in Belarusian football. He was sentenced to one year of community service and banned from Belarusian football for one year.

References

External links

1991 births
Living people
Belarusian footballers
Association football forwards
FC Polotsk players
FC Vitebsk players
FC Slonim-2017 players
FC Smorgon players
FC Naftan Novopolotsk players